The Boston Tea Men were an American soccer team based in North Andover, Massachusetts, United States. Founded in 2009, the team played in the National Premier Soccer League (NPSL), a national amateur league at the fourth tier of the American Soccer Pyramid, in the Northeast Atlantic Division.

The team played its home games in the stadium on the campus of Merrimack College. The team's colors are white, blue and red.

 the team appears to have folded, with the NPSL website no longer listing it nor its own website being active.

History

The Tea Men are a quasi-reincarnation of the former New England Tea Men, who played in the old North American Soccer League from 1978 to 1980 and still have a strong recognition in the Boston soccer community.

Players

2010 Roster
Source:

Year-by-year

Head coaches
  Tony Martone (2010–present)

Stadia
 Stadium at Merrimack College; North Andover, Massachusetts (2010–present)

References

External links
 Official Site
 NPSL Official Site

Association football clubs established in 2009
National Premier Soccer League teams
Soccer clubs in Massachusetts
2009 establishments in Massachusetts
North Andover, Massachusetts
Sports in Essex County, Massachusetts